Enciprazine (INN, BAN; enciprazine hydrochloride (USAN); developmental code names WY-48624, D-3112), is an anxiolytic and antipsychotic of the phenylpiperazine class which was never marketed. It shows high affinity for the α1-adrenergic receptor and 5-HT1A receptor, among other sites. The drug was initially anticipated to produce ortho-methoxyphenylpiperazine (oMeOPP), a serotonin receptor agonist with high affinity for the 5-HT1A receptor, as a significant active metabolite, but subsequent research found this not to be the case.

See also
 Acaprazine
 Batoprazine
 Eltoprazine
 Enpiprazole
 Fluprazine
 Lidanserin
 Ensaculin
 Mafoprazine
 BMY-14802
 Azaperone
 Fluanisone

References

External links
 Enciprazine - AdisInsight

Phenoxypropanolamines
Antipsychotics
Anxiolytics
N-(2-methoxyphenyl)piperazines
Pyrogallol ethers